Affan (Arabic: عفّان) is an Arabic masculine given name meaning "chaste, modest, virtuous, pure". People named Affan include:
Affan ibn Abi al-'As, relative of Islamic prophet Muhammad
Affan Mitul, Bangladeshi film actor
Affan Khan (born 2007), Indian actor
Affan Waheed, Pakistani actor 
Affan Yousuf (born 1994), Indian field hockey forward 
Aban bin Uthman bin Affan (died 723), Muslim historian and scholar
Uthman ibn Affan (576–656), a companion of the Islamic prophet Muhammad 

Arabic masculine given names